Dancing on A'A is the fourth album by Birdsongs of the Mesozoic, released in 1995 through Cuneiform Records.

Track listing

Personnel 
Birdsongs of the Mesozoic
Michael Bierylo – guitar, percussion
Ken Field – alto saxophone, soprano saxophone, flute, synthesizer, percussion
Erik Lindgren – piano, organ, synthesizer, sampler, drum programming, percussion, photography
Rick Scott – clarinet, synthesizer, electronic drums, percussion
Additional musicians and production
Birdsongs of the Mesozoic – production
Mickey Bones – drums, percussion
Bill Carman – engineering
Larry Dersch – drums
Jim Doherty – drums, percussion
Terry Donahue – drums
David Hobbs – photography
Diane Menyuk – design, illustrations
Roger Seibel – mastering
Ken Winokur – percussion

References

1995 albums
Birdsongs of the Mesozoic albums
Cuneiform Records albums